Ajax Reef is a natural coral reef located within the Florida Keys National Marine Sanctuary and also within Biscayne National Park.  Unlike many reefs within the National Marine Sanctuary, this reef is not within a Sanctuary Preservation Area (SPA).  It is north of Pacific Reef.

References
 NOAA National Marine Sanctuary Maps, Florida Keys East
 NOAA Navigational Chart 11463

Coral reefs of the Florida Keys